Richard E. Grant (born Richard Grant Esterhuysen; 5 May 1957) is a Swazi-English actor and presenter. He made his film debut as Withnail in the comedy Withnail and I (1987). Grant received critical acclaim for his role as Jack Hock in Marielle Heller's drama film Can You Ever Forgive Me? (2018), winning various awards including the Independent Spirit Award for Best Supporting Male. He also received Academy Award, BAFTA, Golden Globe, and Screen Actors Guild Award nominations for Best Supporting Actor.

Grant is known for his supporting roles in the feature films How to Get Ahead in Advertising (1989), L.A. Story (1991), Hudson Hawk (1991), The Player (1992), Bram Stoker's Dracula (1992), The Age of Innocence (1993), Spice World (1997), Gosford Park (2001), Corpse Bride (2005), The Iron Lady (2011), Logan (2017), Star Wars: The Rise of Skywalker (2019), Everybody's Talking About Jamie (2021), and Persuasion (2022). He is also known for his roles in television, including Rev. (2011), Doctor Who (2012-2013), Downton Abbey (2014), Girls (2014), Game of Thrones (2016), and Loki (2021).

Early life
Grant was born as Richard Grant Esterhuysen on 5 May 1957 in Mbabane, Protectorate of Swaziland (now Eswatini). He is the son of Leonne and Henrik Esterhuysen; Henrik was head of education for the British government administration in the British protectorate of Swaziland. He has English, Dutch/Afrikaner, and German ancestry. He has a younger brother, Stuart, an accountant in Johannesburg, from whom he is estranged; Grant has stated that they "never had any relationship".

As a boy, Grant went to primary school at St Mark's, a local government school in Mbabane that only recently had become racially integrated. When Grant was 10, he witnessed his mother commit adultery in a car with his father's best friend, which subsequently led to his parents' divorce. This event inspired Grant to keep a daily diary, which he has continued to do ever since.

Grant attended secondary school at Waterford Kamhlaba United World College of Southern Africa, an independent school near Mbabane. In May 1976 he arrived at the University of Cape Town to study English and drama. He adopted his stage name when he moved to Britain (in 1982) as an adult and registered with Equity.

Career
Grant was a member of the Space Theatre Company in Cape Town before moving to London in 1982. He later stated, "I grew up in Swaziland when it was mired in a 1960s sensibility. The kind of English spoken where I grew up was a period English sound and when I came to England people said, 'how strange'. Charles Sturridge, who directed Brideshead Revisited for TV, said, 'you speak English like someone from the 1950s'."

Grant's first film role was the perpetually inebriated title character in the cult classic Withnail and I (1987). Following this, he  started appearing in Hollywood films, in a range of projects from blockbuster studio movies to small independent projects. Since then, Grant has had supporting roles in the films Henry & June, L.A. Story, The Player, The Age of Innocence, The Portrait of a Lady, Spice World, Gosford Park, Bright Young Things, and Penelope.

While filming L.A. Story with Steve Martin, the pair communicated by fax. Martin wrote: "I kept these faxes, which grew to a stack more than 2 inches thick, because they entertained me, and because I thought they were valuable aesthetic chunks from a screeching mind, a stream-of-consciousness faucet spewing sentences – sometimes a mile long – none of it rewritten, and bearing just the right amount of acid and alkaline."

In 1995, Grant starred as the titular character in Peter Capaldi's short film Franz Kafka's It's a Wonderful Life. The film won the 1995 Academy Award for Best Live Action Short Film. In 1996, he portrayed Sir Andrew Aguecheek in Trevor Nunn's Twelfth Night. He released a single and accompanying video "To Be Or Not To Be" with Orpheus in 1997.

Grant has twice portrayed the Doctor from Doctor Who, both outside the main continuity. In the comedy sketch Doctor Who and the Curse of Fatal Death, he portrayed a version of the Tenth Doctor, referred to as the Quite Handsome Doctor. He also voiced a version of the Ninth Doctor for the BBC original animated webcast Scream of the Shalka. The latter had intended to be the official Ninth Doctor prior to the revival of the TV series. He made his first official Doctor Who appearance in the 2012 Christmas special, titled "The Snowmen", in which he plays the villain, Walter Simeon. During the episode Simeon is erased from his body and it is taken over by the Great Intelligence, voiced in that episode by Ian McKellen until the takeover. Grant reprised the role in "The Bells of Saint John" and in the Series 7 finale, "The Name of the Doctor".

Grant appeared as "The Voice" in 2+2+2 at American Nights at The King's Head Theatre, from 3 to 29 July 2007, and in 2008 co-starred in the London-based comedy Filth and Wisdom. Grant presented the 2008 Laurence Olivier Awards. In 2008, he made his musical theatre debut with Opera Australia, playing the role of Henry Higgins in My Fair Lady at the Theatre Royal, Sydney, a role he reprised in 2017 at the Lyric Opera of Chicago. In 2009, Grant played Alain Reille in Yasmina Reza's one-act play God of Carnage at the Theatre Royal, Bath, and subsequently at Cheltenham, Canterbury, Richmond, Brighton, and Milton Keynes.

In 2010 he starred in short film The Man Who Married Himself, which won Best Comedy at LA International Shorts Festival and Rhode Island Film Festival. Later that year, he made an appearance in a music video, when short-lived Bristol band The Chemists hired him to appear in their video for "This City"; the band split the same year. This appearance followed Grant's involvement with the band the previous year, in which he spoke the lyrics to "This City" to background music as part of the intro and outro tracks on their only album, Theories of Dr Lovelock.

In March 2013, Grant starred as intelligence analyst Brian Jones in David Morley's radio drama The Iraq Dossier with Peter Firth, Anton Lesser, David Caves, and Lindsay Duncan. It recounted the story of how British Ministry of Defence Intelligence expert Jones had tried to warn that his government's September Dossier on Iraq's Weapons of Mass Destruction was inaccurate. In 2014, Grant was cast on the HBO series Girls after series creator Lena Dunham saw him in Spice World.

On 9 May 2015, Grant gave a reading at VE Day 70: A Party to Remember in Horse Guards Parade, London. In 2016 he joined the HBO series Game of Thrones in Season 6 as Izembaro.

In July 2018, Lucasfilm announced that Grant would appear in Star Wars: The Rise of Skywalker. That same year, Grant's critically lauded performance as Jack Hock in Can You Ever Forgive Me? (2018) earned him Academy Award, BAFTA, Golden Globe, and Screen Actors Guild Award nominations. The part also won Grant a New York Film Critics Circle Award and several other critics awards.

In March 2020, Grant joined the cast of the Disney+ / Marvel Cinematic Universe series Loki as Classic Loki, an older variant of Loki. Grant portrays Sir Walter Elliot in Carrie Cracknell's 2022 adaptation of Jane Austen's Persuasion. The film was released 15 July 2022 on Netflix.

Wah-Wah
Grant wrote and directed the 2005 film Wah-Wah, loosely based on his own childhood experiences. A screenwriter recommended he write a screenplay after reading Grant's memoirs of his Withnail and I experience. The film took him over seven years to complete and starred Nicholas Hoult in the lead role, with Gabriel Byrne, Miranda Richardson, Julie Walters, and Emily Watson. Grant kept a diary of the experience, later published as a book (The Wah-Wah Diaries). The book received positive reviews from critics, many of whom were impressed by the honesty of the tale, especially in regard to his difficult relationship with the "inexperienced" producer Marie-Castille Mention-Schaar.

Grant stated in subsequent interviews that she was a "control freak out of control", and he would "never see her again as long as [he] live[s]." In a BBC interview, he again mentioned his "disastrous" relationship with Mention-Schaar. He related that he had received only five emails from her in the last two months of pre-production, and that she rarely turned up on the set at all. She failed to obtain clearance firstly for song rights and secondly to film in Swaziland. For the last infraction, Grant was eventually forced to meet with the King of Eswatini to seek clemency. During an interview with an Australian chat show, he mentioned that Wah-Wah was not released in France, and as a result, his producer did not make money out of it.

Personal life

Grant married voice coach Joan Washington in 1986 and had one daughter with her, Olivia, and a stepson, Tom.

Joan, after being diagnosed with stage four lung cancer, died on 2 September 2021.

Grant is a teetotaller; his body has an intolerance of alcohol, having no enzymes in the blood to metabolise it. If he does drink alcohol he is violently sick for up to 24 hours. After casting him as the alcoholic Withnail, director Bruce Robinson made Grant drink a bottle of champagne and half a bottle of vodka during the course of a night so he could experience drunkenness.

Grant is a fan of Barbra Streisand and has done a tour of Streisand's New York, visiting her early home, her high school, and the Village Vanguard, among other places.

Grant is a dual citizen of the United Kingdom and Eswatini (formerly Swaziland). He used to wear a watch on each wrist, one given to him by his dying father, permanently set on Swaziland time.

In October 2008, Grant told The Times that he is an atheist. He is an avid supporter of Premier League football club West Ham United. In April 2014, Grant launched his new unisex perfume, JACK, exclusively at Liberty of Regent Street, London. Grant runs the perfume business in collaboration with his daughter.

In September 2022, Grant released a memoir, A Pocketful of Happiness, mostly written in the last year of his wife's life. He was a guest on BBC Radio 4's Desert Island Discs in November 2022; his choice of book was Lewis Carroll's Alice in Wonderland, his luxury item a piano, and his chosen record "When I Fall In Love" by Nat King Cole.

Filmography

Film

Television

Video games

Other

Awards and nominations

Bibliography 
The Wah-Wah Diaries: The Making of a Film. 2006.  (hardcover).
With Nails: The Film Diaries of Richard E. Grant.  (hardcover).  (paperback).
By Design: A Hollywood Novel. Picador, 1999.  (10).  (13).
A Pocketful of Happiness: A Memoir. Simon & Schuster, 2022  (hardback)

References

External links

 (Interview and profile pertaining to the release of his film Wah-Wah.)
 (Interview and profile regarding his career and fragrance brand Jack Covent Garden.)

1957 births
Living people
20th-century British male actors
21st-century British male actors
Audiobook narrators
British diarists
British male film actors
British male Shakespearean actors
British male stage actors
British male television actors
British male voice actors
British memoirists
British people of Afrikaner descent
British people of German descent
English atheists
English male film actors
English male Shakespearean actors
English male stage actors
English male television actors
English male voice actors
English people of Afrikaner descent
English people of German descent
Independent Spirit Award for Best Supporting Male winners
Outstanding Performance by a Cast in a Motion Picture Screen Actors Guild Award winners
People from Mbabane
Swazi emigrants to the United Kingdom
Swazi people of British descent
University of Cape Town alumni
Waterford Kamhlaba alumni
People educated at a United World College